is a passenger railway station in located in the city of Yao,  Osaka Prefecture, Japan, operated by the private railway operator Kintetsu Railway.

Lines
Hattorigawa Station is served by the Shigi Line, and is located 2.0 rail kilometers from the starting point of the line at Kawachi-Yamamoto Station.

Station layout
The station consists of a single ground-level side platform serving one bi-directional track.

Adjacent stations

History
Hattorigawa Station opened on December 15, 1930.

Passenger statistics
In fiscal 2018, the station was used by an average of 2043 passengers daily.

Surrounding area
Yao Municipal Takayasu Elementary School / Yao Municipal Takayasu Junior High School

See also
List of railway stations in Japan

References

External links

 Hattorigawa Station 

Railway stations in Japan opened in 1930
Railway stations in Osaka Prefecture
Yao, Osaka